Vettai Naai is a 2021 Tamil language action drama film directed by S. Jai Shankar and produced by Surabi P. Jothi Murugan. The film stars R. K. Suresh, Ramki and Subiksha in the lead roles. Produced by Surabi Pictures, it was released on 26 February 2021.

Plot 
Sekhar (R. K. Suresh), a small-time rowdy, who seeks redemption post his marriage. How other rowdies and their leader (Ramki) who were waiting to pounce on him, utilises the situation which affects him and his wife (Subiksha) forms the rest of the story.

Cast 
R. K. Suresh as Sekhar
Ramki as Bose
Subiksha as Rani
Gautham as Jomon
Vijay Karthik
Namo Narayana
Rama
 Vijit Saravanan

Release 
The film was released across theatres in Tamil Nadu on 26 February 2021. A critic from Times of India wrote "this done-to-death plot, which has some not-so-bad scenes, falters in execution as they appear staged." Critic Malini Mannath noted "Vettai Naai which offers nothing new or appealing to an audience, is a futile attempt to reboot an old theme." Reviewers from Tamil newspapers Dina Malar and Maalaimalar also gave the film mixed reviews.

References

External links 
 

2021 films
2020s Tamil-language films
Indian action drama films
2021 action drama films